David Rukhadze (born 9 September 1963 in Tbilisi) is a professional Georgian footballer.

Career
Having finished his football career in the team of another league Meshakhte Tkibuli. In 1985–1989, he was a rock musician at Lokomotiv (Samtredia). During the 1987 season, the team won the first place at the Other Lizi (9th zone). In 1989 he moved to Kolkheti Khobi. In total for the whole team has played 103 matches in the championships of the USSR and Georgia. From 1992 to 1993 he played for Torpedo Kutaisi.

During the winter season, interrupt the 1993–94 season and he moved to Desna Chernihiv, the main club in the city of Chernihiv, where he made its debut on 27 March 1994 in the home match of the 21st round of the Ukrainian Second League against Naftovyk Okhtyrka. David was on the field at the starting match and played the whole match. Sheds 1994 to rock won 9 singles at the First Lizi of Ukraine. Then he turned to Georgia, for the clubs Guria Lanchkhuti, Sioni Bolnisi and Torpedo Kutaisi. In 1996 and 1997, he played in First Russian Championship for Zvezda Irkutsk and Yekaterinburg.

From 1998 to 2010 he worked as a coach at the children school "Dynamo" (Kutaisi), then with the teams "Imereti" and "Meshakhte". In 2016, he got rid of the Іmereti football federation.

References

External links
David Rukhadze Footballfacts.ru

1963 births
Living people
Footballers from Tbilisi
Footballers from Georgia (country)
Expatriate footballers from Georgia (country)
Erovnuli Liga players
FC Guria Lanchkhuti players
FC Desna Chernihiv players
FC Torpedo Kutaisi players
Expatriate footballers in Ukraine
Expatriate sportspeople from Georgia (country) in Ukraine
Association football midfielders
Ukrainian Premier League players
Ukrainian First League players